Vietnam is scheduled to compete in the 2017 Asian Winter Games in Sapporo and Obihiro, Japan from February 19 to 26. This marks the country's official debut at the Asian Winter Games. The country is scheduled to compete in one sport (three disciplines). The team consists of six athletes (all men).

Background
Vietnam is located in a humid continental climate zone, meaning there is no snow or temperatures that are conducive to practicing winter sports outside. Therefore, to prepare for these games the Vietnamese athletes had to practice on sand dunes for three months near the town of Mũi Né in Southern Vietnam.

Competitors
The following table lists the Vietnamese delegation per sport and gender.

Alpine skiing

Vietnam's alpine skiing team consists of three athletes.

Men

Cross-country skiing

Vietnam's cross-county skiing team consists of one athlete.

Man

Snowboarding

Vietnam's snowboarding team consists of two male athletes.

References

Nations at the 2017 Asian Winter Games
Asian Winter Games
Vietnam at the Asian Winter Games